Kerstin Ingrid Therese Sjögran (born 8 April 1977) is a Swedish football manager and coach, and former player as a midfielder for Damallsvenskan club FC Rosengård and the Sweden national team. A modern pioneer and source of inspiration in women's football, she is considered one of the greatest Swedish footballers of all time and imagined by some as a possible future head coach for the national team. Nicknamed "Terre", Sjögran made her first Damallsvenskan appearances for Kristianstad/Wä DFF. She joined Malmö FF Dam in 2001 and remained with the club through its different guises as LdB FC and FC Rosengård. Sjögran spent the 2011 season with American Women's Professional Soccer (WPS) club Sky Blue FC.

Sweden's all-time record appearance holder, Sjögran is the first player to win 200 caps for Blågult and is tied with Birgit Prinz at 214 for the most capped European footballer in national teams. She made her national team debut in October 1997 and represented her country in the 2001, 2005, 2009 and 2013 editions of the UEFA Women's Championship, as well as at the 2003, 2007, 2011 and 2015 FIFA Women's World Cups. She also played at the 2000, 2004 and 2008 Olympic Football Tournaments, but missed out in 2012 due to injury. Sjögran twice won the Diamantbollen, the award for Sweden's female player of the year, in 2007 and 2010.

Today she is sporting director in FC Rosengård.

Club career
Sjögran began playing football with boys at Harlösa IF and moved on to Veberöds AIF at the age of 12. She has mentioned on several occasions as an adult that Jürgen Klinsmann was her greatest inspiration, whom she first saw in the 1990 World Cup. Aged 14, she was already playing for Veberöds' women's team in Division 3. After signing for Division 1 club Wä IF in 1997 Sjögran was part of the team promoted into the Damallsvenskan for the first time that year. She came to the attention of bigger clubs and joined Wä's local rivals Malmö FF Dam in 2001.

Malmö showed good form but were prevented from winning trophies by the dominant Umeå IK team of the era. With Sjögran playing as a left winger, the 2003 Svenska Cupen final finished Umeå 1–0 Malmö, after an extra time goal by Umeå's Hanna Ljungberg. In April 2005, Sjögran rejected advances from several rival clubs to extend her Malmö contract.

Consistent performances from Sjögran at Malmö saw her honoured as Sweden's female Midfielder of the Year in 2007 and 2008. In 2007, she won the Diamantbollen award for the best female footballer in the country.

In March 2009, Sjögran indicated her interest in playing in the English FA WSL, which was supposed to start the following year but was delayed. Later in 2009, she was picked in the American Women's Professional Soccer (WPS) International Draft by Atlanta Beat, but remained loyal to Malmö.

Inspired by 33-year-old Sjögran, Malmö won their first Damallsvenskan championship since 1994 in the 2010 season. It was delighted Sjögran's first league winner's medal after finishing in second place on five previous occasions. Sjögran won the Diamantbollen again in 2010. Her acceptance speech paid tribute to the influence of her step-father. A surprised Sjögran had expected Charlotte Rohlin to win the award.

In December 2010 Malmö let Sjögran move to America, with WPS club Sky Blue FC. Sky Blue coach Jim Gabarra had made Sjögran one of his top transfer targets, describing her as "consistently exceptional". Sjögran played just 13 matches for Sky Blue, as the 2011 FIFA Women's World Cup was scheduled during the 2011 season. Starting 12 of the games, she posted six assists as Sky Blue finished fifth of six teams.

The deal had a clause that Sjögran would return to Malmö after the short American season. She helped Malmö retain their Damallsvenskan title in 2011 and represented the club in the 2011–12 UEFA Women's Champions League.

After a serious knee injury in May 2012, veteran Sjögran eventually returned to full fitness but found it difficult to break back into the starting line-up as Malmö were battling rivals Tyresö FF for the league title. Strong performances for the Swedish national team saw her win back her club place. Malmö and Sjögran won their third title in four seasons in 2013. She was happy to secure her third league winner's medal in October 2013, as Malmö beat Umeå IK 2–0 to take an unassailable six-point lead over Tyresö at the top of the table.

Sjögran signed a new contract with Malmö, now known as FC Rosengård, in May 2014. She wanted to remain with the club for the rest of her playing career. In June 2014 she was linked with a coaching role at the club. Sjögran helped Rosengård defend their title in 2014.

On 28 April 2015 Rosengård announced that Sjögran had been appointed as the club's next sporting director, starting 1 August, replacing Erling Nilsson (who would remain in the club as a "mentor") and that she intended to retire from playing after the summer's World Cup in Canada. On 21 May 2015 Sjögran played what seemed to be her final league game, but she didn't want to celebrate then. It was reported in July 2015 that Sjögran would play her 426th and final game for the club in their Svenska Cupen semi-final against Umeå. She was thanked and celebrated right before and after that match.

On 20 July Therese Sjögran hastily took over as head coach, meant temporarily, after Markus Tilly went on sick leave for family reasons. She didn't like it much.
Shortly after, with Rosengård suffering a dip in form, having several players injured and star player Anja Mittag recently left the club, and locked in a title challenge with Eskilstuna United, Sjögran was pressed into another hastily endeavor, making a temporary playing comeback on 26 July despite having said just a few days earlier that she would not do so. On 1 August Rosengård announced they had signed with a new head coach, thus relieving Sjögran. Sjögran stepped in and played once more 5 August against Eskilstuna and on 9 August 2015, in the Svenska Cupen final against Linköping, a game Rosengård lost, this time promising it would definitely be her last time.

In the league Rosengård overcame the absence of coach Markus Tilly and the departure of star players Anja Mittag and Ramona Bachmann to secure their third successive title, with a final day 5–0 win over Linköpings FC.

Sjögran disclosed in an interview about a children's book based on her youth years, Rött kort, Therese!, that the only time she received a red card was in Veberöd after having practiced lately on sliding and tried to execute that in a match with bad result.

Sjögran made another temporary playing comeback on 7 February 2016 in a friendly against Manchester City, as FC Rosengård suffered many sick and injured players, but she was only in the technical area as a substitute and never actually played.

International career
Sjögran made her first appearance for the senior Swedish national team on 30 October 1997; a 3–1 friendly defeat by the United States in Chattanooga, Tennessee. She was fast-tracked into the national team by coach Marika Domanski-Lyfors although she had not yet played in Sweden's top division. After some injury problems kept her out of club football, Sjögran was not selected for the 1999 FIFA Women's World Cup in the United States. She returned to the squad for the 2000 Sydney Olympics, but was mainly an understudy and was restricted to substitute appearances as Sweden crashed out in the first round.

Sjögran was a more established first team player by the time of UEFA Women's Euro 2001. She came on as a substitute in all Sweden's games except the final, which she started. Sweden lost 1–0 to Claudia Müller's golden goal for hosts Germany.

At the 2003 FIFA Women's World Cup, Sjögran was substituted at half-time in Sweden's first match, a 3–1 loss to hosts the United States. She came on as a substitute in Sweden's remaining matches and won praise for her performance in the final, which Sweden again lost to Germany on a golden goal. In its tournament review, the Expressen newspaper described Sjögran as a talented enigma who seemed incapable of translating her best performances to the international stage.

Following the retirement of midfield star Malin Moström in late 2006, Sjögran was given a more prominent role by coach Thomas Dennerby. As part of the Sweden team surprisingly eliminated in the first round of the 2007 FIFA Women's World Cup, Sjögran was one of few Swedish players to emerge with any credit from the tournament. She also played a leading role as Sweden beat rivals Denmark in a qualification play-off for the following year's Olympics. In China 2008 she participated in the Swedes' 2–0 quarter-final defeat by Germany.

At the 2011 Algarve Cup Sjögran surpassed Victoria Sandell Svensson's national record of 166 caps, after playing in a 2–1 defeat to Japan. She marked the occasion by scoring her 17th international goal, direct from a free kick.

Experienced "elder stateswoman" Sjögran helped Sweden achieve third place at the 2011 FIFA Women's World Cup in Germany. She assisted Lisa Dahlqvist's winning goal against North Korea in the group stage, and started Sweden's 3–1 semi-final defeat to eventual winners Japan in Frankfurt. Sjögran played the whole match as Sweden secured third place by beating France 2–1 in Sinsheim.

Third place ensured Sweden's qualification for the 2012 Olympic football tournament in London. In May 2012, Sjögran tore her anterior cruciate ligament and was ruled out of the Olympics. Although she was aged 35, Sjögran did not consider retirement. She aimed to recover in time for UEFA Women's Euro 2013, which Sweden were hosting.

Incoming coach Pia Sundhage selected Sjögran in the Sweden squad for Euro 2013, admitting it was something of a gamble and demanding that Sjögran should expend "the last drop of sweat" to justify her place. Sjögran had not expected to be recalled and had even purchased tickets to attend the tournament as a supporter. At the final tournament Sjögran made substitute appearances in the 3–1 group win over Italy and the 1–0 defeat by Germany in the semi-final. Team-mate Lotta Schelin praised Sjögran's contribution, describing her as "an old gem".

In November 2013, the Swedish Football Association (SvFF) sparked a sexism scandal at its annual awards Fotbollsgalan when it presented Anders Svensson with a Volvo XC60 car for winning 146 caps. SvFF was widely criticised for failing to honour Sjögran, who had 187 caps. Afterwards SvFF claimed that they had planned to reward and celebrate Sjögran at a later occasion, but failed to properly inform internally. Chairman Karl-Erik Nilsson later regretted the decision, saying it would have been better if they paid tribute to Sjögran as well. Car manufacturers Peugeot and Citroën voluntarily on their own initiative offered to lend one of their newest models to Sjögran.

Coach Sundhage continued to select Sjögran for Sweden's successful 2015 FIFA Women's World Cup qualification campaign. She played alongside Lotta Schelin as a forward against Northern Ireland in Växjö, deputising for the injured Kosovare Asllani, a move that surprised some, as older players tend to get moved backward a bit and have a more defensive role. She scored the first goal. That was her 193rd game in the national team. In October 2014 Sjögran reached her 200th appearance for Sweden, in a 2–1 home friendly defeat by Germany. She became the first Swedish player to achieve the milestone and only the third European after Birgit Prinz and Katrine Pedersen.

In November 2014, SvFF again sparked a sexism scandal involving Therese Sjögran at Fotbollsgalan, this time in conjunction with TV4. There was a celebration planned and prepared for the ceremony for her achieving 200 caps, but it was cancelled in the middle of the show before it occurred because of time constraints.

At the 2015 FIFA Women's World Cup, Sjögran made her 214th and final appearance in Sweden's 4–1 round of 16 defeat by Germany, putting her in split first place with Birgit Prinz for most capped European footballer in national teams.
She left the field with tears in her eyes and kept the match ball as a souvenir for her mother. Afterwards she felt empty and woeful having exited and quit that way with a heavy loss.

Before Fotbollsgalan 2015 Sjögran said she didn't want to be honoured this time, as she thought it was too late. But SvFF kept their plan and this time actually followed it though, rewarding her with Fotbollskanalens hederspris, The Football Channel's honorary award.

Managerial career
Since 1 August 2015 Sjögran is sporting director in FC Rosengård.

Personal life
In an interview made in 2005 before the European Championship Sjögran states that she would choose innebandy if she wouldn't play football. Her favourite food was shellfish, her favourite music was techno/house and her favourite movie was Saw. She thought Birgit Prinz was the best current player and that golfer Annika Sörenstam was the best Swedish athlete of all time. In a short interview made in 2013 she also mentioned table tennis as a secondary sports choice.

Economics graduate Sjögran took legal action when she was refused unemployment benefit on the grounds that her football career stopped her being available for work. She later worked part-time for the insurance company, Trygg-Hansa.

Sports journalist Anja Gatu wrote a fictional biographical children's book, with illustrations by Maria Borgelöv, about Sjögran's early years in Harlösa IF titled Rött kort, Therese! ("Red card, Therese!") in 2015. One and a half-year later Gatu wrote a sequel titled Snygg fint, Therese! ("Nice feint, Therese!").

Sjögran participated in SVT's 2017 season of Mästarnas mästare which was recorded in Algarve, Portugal in September 2016. She was once again miscredited for her deeds as SVT in a press release before a press gathering for the show had left out most of her merits and claimed that Anders Svensson was the most capped Swedish player. The car incident from Fotbollsgalan was supposedly brought up during recording of her recap in the show, but was ultimately cut from the broadcast.

She still played football regularly in 2016, but only in Swedish amateur league Korpen.

Career statistics

Matches and goals scored at World Cup & Olympic tournaments

Matches and goals scored at European Championship tournaments

Honours

Veberöds AIF
 Division 3: 1994

Wä FF
 Division 1: 1997

LdB FC Malmö/FC Rosengård
 Damallsvenskan: 2010, 2011, 2013, 2014, 2015
 Svenska Supercupen: 2011, 2012, 2015

Sweden
 FIFA Women's World Cup: runner-up 2003; third place 2011
 UEFA Women's Euro: runner-up 2001
 Algarve Cup: 2001, 2009
Australia Cup: 2003

Individual
 Best female player in Sweden: 2007, 2010
 Best female midfielder in Sweden: 2007, 2008
 Soccer Channel special prize: 2015

References

Match reports

External links

 
 
 
  
  
 
 
 Sjögran Interview 
 Video interview Swedish midfielders Therese Sjögran and Caroline Seger in 2015 Algarve Cup by SOCCER.COM on YouTube
 Article with a dozen of historical images of Sjögran  by Sportbladet/Aftonbladet.
 Video of the press conference of Sjögran's plans to quit playing and become sporting director  by Sydsvenskan on YouTube.
 Sjögran receives Fotbollskanalens Hederspris  by TV4 Sport on YouTube.
 Interview in her role as sporting director. Unknown date, but from the content seems to be 2018 or 2019. 
 Another interview in her role as sporting director 
 

1977 births
Living people
Swedish women's footballers
Sweden women's international footballers
Footballers at the 2000 Summer Olympics
Footballers at the 2004 Summer Olympics
Footballers at the 2008 Summer Olympics
Olympic footballers of Sweden
FIFA Century Club
2003 FIFA Women's World Cup players
2007 FIFA Women's World Cup players
2011 FIFA Women's World Cup players
2015 FIFA Women's World Cup players
NJ/NY Gotham FC players
FC Rosengård players
Kristianstads DFF players
Damallsvenskan players
People from Lund Municipality
Expatriate women's soccer players in the United States
Swedish expatriate sportspeople in the United States
Women's association football midfielders
Women's Professional Soccer players
Sportspeople from Skåne County